Anguinidae is a family of nematode.

References

Tylenchida
Plant pathogenic nematodes
Nematode families